Huntsville Township is located in Schuyler County, Illinois. As of the 2010 census, its population was 150 and it contained 82 housing units.

Geography

Demographics

References

External links
 US Census
 City-data.com
 Illinois State Archives

Townships in Schuyler County, Illinois
Townships in Illinois